Modern Matrimony is a 1923 American silent comedy drama film directed by Victor Heerman and starring Owen Moore, Alice Lake, and Mayme Kelso.

Cast

Preservation
With no prints of Modern Matrimony located in any film archives, it is a lost film.

References

Bibliography
 Robert B. Connelly. The Silents: Silent Feature Films, 1910-36, Volume 40, Issue 2. December Press, 1998.

External links

1923 films
1923 comedy films
1920s English-language films
American silent feature films
Silent American comedy films
American black-and-white films
Films directed by Victor Heerman
Selznick Pictures films
1920s American films